Elections to Liverpool Town Council were held on Thursday 1 November 1859. One third of the council seats were up for election, the term of office of each councillor being three years.

Seven of the sixteen wards were uncontested.

After the election, the composition of the council was:

Election result

Because seven of the sixteen seats were uncontested, these statistics should be taken in that context.

Ward results

* - Retiring Councillor seeking re-election

Abercromby

Castle Street

Everton

Exchange

Great George

Lime Street

As there had been no votes cast between 1 p.m. and 2 p.m., the poll was closed.

North Toxteth

Voting throughout the day.

Pitt Street

Rodney Street

St. Anne Street

St. Paul's

St. Peter's

Scotland

South Toxteth

Vauxhall

West Derby

Aldermanic Elections

At the meeting of the Council on 9 November 1859, the terms of office of eight 
alderman expired.

The following eight were elected as Aldermen by the Council 
(Aldermen and Councillors) on 10 November 1862 for a term of six years.

* - re-elected aldermen.

By-elections

No. 2, Scotland, 18 November 1859

Caused by the election of Councillor John Woodruff (Conservative, Scotland, elected 1 November 1859) as an alderman by the Council on 9 November 1859.

No. 15, South Toxteth, 18 November 1859

Caused by the election of Councillor John Stewart (Conservative, South Toxteth, elected 1 November 1857) as an alderman by the Council on 9 November 1859.

See also

Liverpool City Council

Liverpool Town Council elections 1835 - 1879

Liverpool City Council elections 1880–present

Mayors and Lord Mayors 
of Liverpool 1207 to present

History of local government in England

References

1859
1859 English local elections
November 1859 events
1850s in Liverpool